The Świętokrzyskie Voivodeship, also known as the Świętokrzyskie Province, and the Holy Cross Voivodeship is a voivodeship (province) of Poland situated in southeastern part of the country, in the historical region of Lesser Poland. Its capital and largest city is Kielce.

Świętokrzyskie Voivodeship is bounded by six other voivodeships: Masovian to the north, Lublin to the east, Subcarpathian to the southeast, Lesser Poland to the south, Silesian to the southwest and Łódź to the northwest.

The province was created on 1 January 1999, out of the former Kielce Voivodeship, eastern part of Częstochowa Voivodeship and western part of Tarnobrzeg Voivodeship, pursuant to the Polish local government reforms adopted in 1998. As at 2019, the total population of Świętokrzyskie Voivodeship is 1,237,369.

Cities and towns 

The voivodeship contains 4 cities and 39 towns. These are listed below in descending order of population (according to official figures for 2019):

Administrative division 
Świętokrzyskie Voivodeship is divided into 14 counties (powiats): 1 city county and 13 land counties. These are further divided into 102 gminas.

The counties are listed in the following table (ordering within categories is by decreasing population).

Economy 
The Gross domestic product (GDP) of the province was 11.6 billion € in 2018, accounting for 2.3% of the Polish economic output. GDP per capita adjusted for purchasing power was 15,400 € or 51% of the EU27 average in the same year. The GDP per employee was 58% of the EU average. Świętokrzyskie Voivodship is the province with the fifth lowest GDP per capita in Poland.

Protected areas

Protected areas in Świętokrzyskie Voivodeship include one National Park and nine Landscape Parks. These are listed below.
Świętokrzyski National Park
Chęciny-Kielce Landscape Park
Cisów-Orłowiny Landscape Park
Jeleniowska Landscape Park
Kozubów Landscape Park
Nida Landscape Park
Przedbórz Landscape Park (partly in Łódź Voivodeship)
Sieradowice Landscape Park
Suchedniów-Oblęgorek Landscape Park
Szaniec Landscape Park

See also
Świętokrzyskie cuisine
Second Polish Republic's Kielce Voivodeship (1919–1939)
 Lesser Polish Way

References

External links

 Świętokrzyskie Voivodeship official website (Polish, English, German)
 Świętokrzyski Urząd Wojewódzki Official website (Polish, English, Russian, Ukrainian, French)
 Regional Tourist Information Center official website (Polish, English, German)

 
States and territories established in 1999